A dryad is a form of mythological Greek nymph associated with trees.

Dryad may also refer to:

Military
 , any one of several ships of the Royal Navy
 Dryad-class torpedo gunboat, in the Royal Navy
 Operation Dryad, a British Second World War commando raid
 DRYAD, a cryptographic system used by the United States military
 Dryade-class frigate, class of ship in the French Navy
 French frigate Dryade (1783), Hébé-class ship of the French Navy

Entertainment
 Dryad (comics), a Marvel Comics character
 Dryad (DC Comics), planet in DC Comics, home world for Blok
 Dryad (Dungeons & Dragons), game character
 Dryad, a character in the Quest for Glory game series

Music
 Dryad, role in the opera Ariadne auf Naxos by Richard Strauss
 Dryad, role in the opera Scylla et Glaucus by Jean-Marie Leclair
 Dryads, composition for voice and orchestra by John Bevan Baker
 Dryads and Pan from Myths by [Karol Szymanowski]]

Literature
 Dryad, collection of stories by Ethel Mannin
 Dryades, poem by William Diaper

Places
 Dryad, Washington, an unincorporated town
 Dryad Lake, a lake in Montana
 Dryades Street, street and district in Central City, New Orleans
 Dryad Point, headland on North-East corner of Campbell Island in British Columbia

Other
 Dryad (repository), a nonprofit organization and international repository of scientific and medical data
 Dryad (programming), a Microsoft programming infrastructure
 SS Savoia, later renamed Dryad, a refrigerated cargo ship
 Dryad Press, a book publisher
 Dryad, painting by Evelyn De Morgan
 Dryade, merchant ship built by William Scott Shipbuilders
 Dryad (Minois dryas), a species of butterfly
 Dryad (HBC vessel), operated by the HBC from 1825-1836, see Hudson's Bay Company vessels

See also
 The Dryad (disambiguation)
 Dryas (disambiguation)
 Dryad's saddle (Polyporus squamosus), an edible basidiomycete mushroom